In computer science, a pebble automaton is any variant of an  automaton which augments the original model with a finite number of "pebbles" that may be used to mark tape positions.

History

Tree-walking automata with nested pebbles

Besides ordinary actions, an automaton can put a pebble at a currently visited node, lift a pebble from the currently visited node and perform a test "is the i-th pebble present at the current node?". There is an important stack restriction on the order in which pebbles can be put or lifted - the i+1-th pebble can be put only if the pebbles from 1st to i-th are already on the tree, and the i+1-th pebble can be lifted only if pebbles from i+2-th to n-th are not on the tree. Without this restriction, the automaton has undecidable emptiness and expressive power beyond regular tree languages.

The class of languages recognized by deterministic (resp. nondeterministic) tree-walking automata with n pebbles is denoted  (resp. ). We also define  and likewise .

Properties

there exists a language recognized by a tree-walking automaton with 1 pebble, but not by any ordinary tree walking automaton; this implies that either  or these classes are incomparable, which is an open problem
, i.e. tree-walking automata augmented with pebbles are strictly weaker than branching automata
it is not known whether , i.e. whether tree-walking pebble automata can be determinized
it is not known whether tree-walking pebble automata are closed under complementation
the pebble hierarchy is strict for tree-walking automata, for every n  and

Automata and logic

Tree-walking pebble automata admit an interesting logical characterization. Let  denote the set of tree properties describable in transitive closure first-order logic, and  the same for positive transitive closure logic, i.e. a logic where the transitive closure operator is not used under the scope of negation. Then it can be proved that  and, in fact,  - the languages recognized by tree-walking pebble automata are exactly those expressible in positive transitive closure logic.

See also

Tree walking automata
Branching automata
Transitive closure logic
Pebble game

Trees (data structures)
Automata (computation)

References